Fleetwood is an unincorporated community in Jefferson County, Oklahoma, United States. It was named after H.H. Fleetwood, who was a ferry operator on the Red River. A post office operated in Fleetwood from 1885 to 1961.

References

Unincorporated communities in Oklahoma
Unincorporated communities in Jefferson County, Oklahoma